The 1550 siege of Fukashi was one of a series of battles waged by Takeda Shingen in his long campaign to conquer Shinano province, which was ruled by a number of minor daimyō, notably the Suwa, Ogasawara,  and Takato.

Shingen mounted his first invasion of Shinano in 1542 and steadily worked his way northwards, defeating the Suwa and Takato by 1547. His inexorable advance through the province alarmed the Uesugi clan, which controlled Echigo province to the north, and in 1547 Uesugi Norimasa sent an army into the province to confront Shingen, but this was swept aside at Odaihara. At this point the Murakami and Ogasawara finally entered the fray, and Murakami Yoshikiyo succeeded in defeating Shingen at Uedahara (1548), but Shingen regrouped and went back on the offensive in 1550. Identifying Yoshikiyo as the greater threat, he decided to concentrate his initial efforts on the weaker Ogasawara, and attacked their principal castle at Fukashi.

Shingen was able to size Fukashi without much difficulty, and Shingen placed Baba Nobuharu in charge of it the fortress. Matsumoto Castle was later built on the site.

The loss of Fukashi broke the power of the Ogasawara clan, and Ogasawara Nagatoki was forced to flee and seek refuge with his ally Murakami Yoshikiyo at Katsurao, which was itself besieged by Shingen four years later.

References

Fukashi 1550
1550 in Japan
Conflicts in 1550
Fukashi 1550
Fukashi